Nathan Stoltzfus is an American historian and  Dorothy and Jonathan Rintels Professor of Holocaust Studies in the history department at Florida State University. He has authored or edited many books.

Education and early career
Stoltzfus was educated at Goshen College in Goshen, Indiana, (B.A. 1978) and Harvard University (PhD, 1993).

While working on his PhD at Harvard, he was awarded an Einstein Institution Fellowship, which supported his work on the Rosenstrasse protest, a 1943 street protest in which mostly women saved about 1,500 men from the Holocaust in Nazi Germany during World War II. Stoltzfus continued as a Graduate Affiliate of the Program on Nonviolent Sanctions.

Career
Stolzfus is noted for his work on protest during the Nazi era, particularly the Rosenstrasse Protest that has sparked debate and discussion about the possibility and impact of protest in Nazi Germany.

Stoltzfus has done work on the impact of the Cold War and its demise on national memories and representations of World War II in several European countries.

Publications
Resistance of the Heart: Intermarriage and the Rosenstrasse Protest in Nazi Germany (1996) was co-recipient of the Fraenkel Prize in Contemporary History. German and French translations carried a foreword by German Foreign Minister, Joschka Fischer. American historian Walter Laqueur wrote in his foreword that "Stoltzfus is the first to investigate the events leading to the protest systematically and in depth, [including] interviews with surviving participants and eyewitnesses... and it is to Dr. Stoltzfus's great credit that he has saved from oblivion some of these unsung heroes". In Britain the book was a New Statesman "Book of the Year". It was #2 on the German Bestenliste for non-fiction in October 1999 and a Main Selection of the Swedish Book Club Clio in 2004. Die Zeit called it the "standard work" on the protest, which was the center of a little Historikerstreit. Die Zeit reported in 2013 that the protest action in the Rosenstrasse was a long almost forgotten episode of Nazi history, but when Stoltzfus wrote about it, he unleashed an "ongoing controversy".

He has contributed to other books including Social Outsiders in Nazi Germany (Princeton University Press, 2001), co-edited with Robert Gellately;  Shades of Green: Environmental Activism around the Globe (Rowman & Littlefield, 2006), co-edited with Doug Weiner and Christof Mauch, Courageous Resistance: The Power of Ordinary People (Palgrave MacMillan, 2007), co-authored with five professors of history, political science, and sociology; Nazi Crimes and the Law (Cambridge University Press, 2008), co-edited with Henry Friedlander.

References

External links
Unfinished documentary by Chambon Foundation

Florida State University faculty
21st-century American historians
21st-century American male writers
Living people
Harvard University alumni
Goshen College alumni
Year of birth missing (living people)
Historians of the Holocaust
Nazi Germany
American male non-fiction writers